Lasse Sørensen (born 6 March 1982) is a retired Danish professional football goalkeeper, who currently is the goalkeeper coach of FC Roskilde.

References

External links
 Boldklubben Frem profile
National team profile
Career statistics at Danmarks Radio

1982 births
Living people
Danish men's footballers
Ølstykke FC players
Boldklubben Frem players
Næstved Boldklub players
AC Horsens players
Danish Superliga players
Køge Nord FC players
Association football goalkeepers